Tetrastigma voinierianum, called chestnut vine and lizard plant, is a species of flowering plant in the genus Tetrastigma, native to Laos and Vietnam, and introduced in Hawaii. It has gained the Royal Horticultural Society's Award of Garden Merit as a hothouse ornamental.

References

Vitaceae
Plants described in 1910